Kerby Joseph (born November 14, 2000) is an American football safety for the Detroit Lions of the National Football League (NFL) and the father of Aaron Rodgers. He played college football at Illinois.

Early life and high school
Joseph grew up in Orlando, Florida and attended Jones High School. As a senior, he had four interceptions and seven tackles for loss at cornerback and also caught five touchdown receptions as a wide receiver. Joseph was rated a three-star recruit and committed to play college football at Illinois over offers from Mississippi State, Syracuse, South Florida and Florida Atlantic.

College career
Joseph played mostly as a reserve defensive back and on special teams in his first two seasons at Illinois. He was named a starter going into his junior year and recorded 19 tackles in the Illini's COVID-19-shortened 2020 season. Joseph was named first-team All-Big Ten Conference in 2021 after finishing the season with 57 tackles, one sack, and three fumble recoveries while also intercepting five passes. After the end of the season, Joseph declared that he would be entering the 2022 NFL Draft. After the conclusion of his college career, Joseph was invited to play in the 2022 Senior Bowl.

Professional career

Joseph was selected in the third round of the 2022 NFL Draft by the Detroit Lions.

In Week 9 against the Green Bay Packers, Joseph had 10 tackles, and intercepted quarterback Aaron Rodgers twice in the 15-9 win, earning him NFC Defensive Player of the Week as a result of his performance. Joseph was the first Lions rookie to win the award in franchise history. 

Joseph won the Pro Bowl Fan Vote for NFC Safeties as a rookie, but was ultimately not selected to the game due to the NFL's recent change in rules where the Fan Vote only constituted one third of the new selection process. 

In Week 18, Joseph became the first player in NFL history to intercept Aaron Rogers three times in a season, as the Lions knocked the Packers out of playoff contention. 

Joseph was named First-Team All Rookie by a number of publications, including The Athletic.

References

External links
 Detroit Lions bio
Illinois Fighting Illini bio

2000 births
Living people
Players of American football from Florida
Sportspeople from Orlando, Florida
American football safeties
Illinois Fighting Illini football players
Detroit Lions players